Uroloba is a genus of moths in the family Pterophoridae.

Species
Uroloba calycospila (Meyrick, 1932)
Uroloba fuscicostata Walsingham, 1891

Pterophorinae
Moth genera
Taxa named by Thomas de Grey, 6th Baron Walsingham